The name Sergio has been used for four tropical cyclones in the Eastern Pacific Ocean.
 Tropical Storm Sergio (1978) – threatened Baja California.
 Hurricane Sergio (1982) – never threatened land.
 Hurricane Sergio (2006) – never threatened land.
 Hurricane Sergio (2018) – made landfall in Baja California as a weak tropical storm.

Pacific hurricane set index articles